The Egyptian goose (Alopochen aegyptiaca) is a member of the duck, goose, and swan family Anatidae. It is native to Africa south of the Sahara and the Nile Valley.

Egyptian geese were considered sacred by the Ancient Egyptians, and appeared in much of their artwork. Because of their popularity chiefly as an ornamental bird, escapees are common and feral populations have become established in Western Europe, the United States, and New Zealand.

Taxonomy 
The Egyptian goose is believed to be most closely related to the shelducks (genus Tadorna) and their relatives, and is placed with them in the subfamily Tadorninae. It is the only extant member of the genus Alopochen, which also contains closely related prehistoric and recently extinct species. mtDNA cytochrome b sequence data suggest that the relationships of Alopochen to Tadorna need further investigation.

Etymology
The word χήν : chēn is grammatically of either masculine or feminine gender.

The species name aegyptiacus (or aegyptiaca) is from the Latin Aegyptiacus, "Egyptian".

Description 

It swims well and in flight looks heavy, more like a goose than a duck, hence the English name.

The sexes of this species are identical in plumage but the males average slightly larger. There is a fair amount of variation in plumage tone, with some birds greyer and others browner, but this is not sex- or age-related. A large part of the wings of mature birds is white, but in repose the white is hidden by the wing coverts. When it is aroused, either in alarm or aggression, the white begins to show. In flight or when the wings are fully spread in aggression, the white is conspicuous.

The voices and vocalisations of the sexes differ, the male having a hoarse, subdued duck-like quack which seldom sounds unless it is aroused. The male Egyptian goose attracts its mate with an elaborate, noisy courtship display that includes honking, neck stretching and feather displays. The female has a far noisier raucous quack that frequently sounds in aggression and almost incessantly at the slightest disturbance when tending her young.

Distribution 
This species breeds widely in Africa except in deserts and dense forests, and is locally abundant. They are found mostly in the Nile Valley and south of the Sahara. While not breeding, it disperses somewhat, sometimes making longer migrations northwards into the arid regions of the Sahel. It spread to Great Britain, Denmark, the Netherlands, Belgium, France, Germany and Italy where there are self-sustaining populations which are mostly derived from escaped ornamental birds. Escapes have also bred on occasion in other places, such as Texas, Florida, California, and New Zealand.

The British population dates back to the 18th century, though only formally added to the British list in 1971. In Great Britain, it is found mainly in East Anglia, and in various locations along the River Thames, where it breeds at sites with open water, short grass and suitable nesting locations (either islands, holes in old trees or amongst epicormic shoots on old trees). During the winter, they are widely dispersed within river valleys, where they feed on short grass and cereals. In the United Kingdom in 2009, it was officially declared a non-native species. Accordingly, Egyptian geese in Great Britain may be shot without special permission if they cause problems.

In Europe, the species has been included since 2017 in the list of Invasive Alien Species of Union concern (the Union list). This implies that this species cannot be imported, bred, transported, commercialized, used, exchanged or intentionally released into the environment and member states are obliged to try to eradicate the species.

Behaviour 
This is a largely terrestrial species, which will also perch readily on trees and buildings. Egyptian geese typically eat seeds, leaves, grasses and plant stems. Occasionally, they will eat locusts, worms, or other small animals.  Until the goslings are a few weeks old and strong enough to graze, they feed largely on small aquatic invertebrates, especially freshwater plankton. As a result, if anoxic conditions lead to the production of botulinum toxin and it gets passed up the food chain via worms and insect larvae insensitive to the toxin, entire clutches of goslings feeding on such prey may die. The parents, who do not eat such organisms to any significant extent, generally remain unaffected.

Both sexes are aggressively territorial towards their own species when breeding and frequently pursue intruders into the air, attacking them in aerial "dogfights". Egyptian geese have been observed attacking aerial objects such as drones that enter their habitat as well. Neighbouring pairs may even kill another's offspring for their own offsprings' survival, as well as for more resources.

This species will nest in a large variety of situations, especially in holes in mature trees in parkland. The female builds the nest from reeds, leaves and grass and both parents take turns incubating the eggs. Egyptian geese usually pair for life. Both the male and female care for the offspring until they are old enough to care for themselves. Such parental care, however, does not include foraging for the young, who, being precocial, forage for themselves.

In their native range, predators of Egyptian geese include leopards, lions, cheetahs, hyenas, crocodiles and Old World vultures.

Gallery

References

External links

 Egyptian Goose information from Birds of Britain
 Egyptian Goose photos from Go Birding
 Species text in The Atlas of Southern African Birds
 
 
 
 
 
 

Egyptian goose
Egyptian goose
Birds of Africa
Egyptian goose
Egyptian goose